Myntverket (officially AB Myntverket) is a private Swedish company that produces coins and medals, including the Swedish national coins and the Nobel Prize medals. , Swedish coins are minted by Myntverket's parent company, Mint of Finland Ltd in Helsinki, Finland, ending a 1,012-year history of minting Swedish coins in Sweden.

See also 
 List of mints

References

External links 
 Myntverket - official site

Manufacturing companies of Sweden
Mints (currency)
Companies based in Södermanland County